ALISON (Advance Learning Interactive Systems Online) is an Irish online education platform for higher education, teaching workplace skills and exploring new interests that provides certificate courses and accredited diploma courses. It was founded on 21 April 2007 in Galway, Ireland, by Irish social entrepreneur Mike Feerick. 

As of July 2022, Alison offers over 4,000 courses in a variety of subjects to over 25 million learners worldwide, and has over 4.5 million graduates.

History
Mike Feerick designed and developed the platform in 2006. On 21 April 2007, Alison was launched with its first free customer and six courses. The platform allows registered users to access digitally-based education and skills training for free.

On 5 July 2016, President Pranab Mukherjee of India announced the partnership between Alison and the National Skill Development Corporation. 

In April 2017, the company launched its mobile application.

In March 2021, Alison announced the acquisition of Dash Beyond, an India-based edutech company that specializes in career development and skills training. In May 2021, Alison announced an agreement with Co-operation Ireland for the West of Ireland. The three-year sponsorship will seed the development of a Support Chapter for the North/South peace charity in the West of Ireland, and the development of an All-Ireland Online Schools Programme.

Products and services

Business model
Alison's income is generated from advertising and sales of certificates. According to The Economist, the company seeks to drive education through advertising in the manner of television and radio. The platform uses an online pay per click advertising revenue model.

Courses
As of 2022, Alison has courses and learning verticals across nine core subject categories, at both certificate and diploma levels. There is no time limit for completing a course. Alison's ABC IT course, a fifteen to twenty-hour training suite, was cited by The New York Times as "covering similar ground" to the International Computer Driving License without the cost of certification. In 2020, Alison published a course on the coronavirus and translated it into more than 50 languages. In partnership with mEducation Alliance, Alison is developing 2 courses on digital literacy in 2022 to strengthen community development and self-reliance efforts in lower resource, developing countries. Alison, in partnership with EcoEd4All, also offers a range of environmental education courses to educate students about climate change. Alison's courses are accredited by CPD UK, the continuing professional development institution in the United Kingdom. The company also conducts Workplace Wellbeing Survey, a Welliba workplace wellbeing Survey in partnership with the healthcare provider Welliba.

Reception
Alison was among the four winners of the 2010 UNESCO King Hamad bin Isa Al Khalifa Prize, a Prize for innovation in ICT for Education. In October 2013, Alison won an award at the World Innovation Summit for Education held in Qatar. 

David Bornstein of The New York Times noted that "practical skills training is usually expensive." Initially some observers also predicted the ineffectiveness of the MOOC model in delivering real educational impact, highlighting the lack of personal interaction with educators and the high drop-out rate of users with no incentive to commit without any material investment of their own.

In February 2021, Alison was awarded the Civil Solidarity Prize by the European Economic and Social Committee (EESC) for its free course "Coronavirus – What you need to know", which was published in February 2020 to inform people about the spread of the virus, its effects and how to protect themselves.

See also
 Language education
 List of Language Self-Study Programs
 Massive open online course

References

External links
 

Irish educational websites
Education companies established in 2007
Organizations established in 2007
Companies of Ireland
Education companies
Educational organisations based in Ireland
Distance education institutions based in the Republic of Ireland